The Cape Verde participated in the 2010 Summer Youth Olympics in Singapore.

Athletics

Note: The athletes who do not have a "Q" next to their Qualification Rank advance to a non-medal ranking final.

Boys
Track and road events

Taekwondo

References

2010 in Cape Verdean sport
Cape Verde at the Youth Olympics